David Humphreys Storer (March 26, 1804—September 10, 1891) was an American physician and naturalist. He served as dean of the Faculty of Medicine at Harvard Medical School from 1855–1864, and published on the reptiles and fishes of New England. He was elected as a member of the American Philosophical Society in 1872.

The colubrid snake genus Storeria is named in his honor.

Selected bibliography
Storer, David Humphreys; Peabody, William Bourne Oliver (1839). Reports on the Fishes, Reptiles and Birds of Massachusetts. Boston: Dutton and Wentworth, State Printers. 
Storer DH (1846). "A Synopsis of the Fishes of North America". Memoirs of the American Academy of Arts and Sciences 2: 253–550.
Storer DH (1853). "A History of the Fishes of Massachusetts". Memoirs of the American Academy of Arts and Sciences 5 (1): 122–168.
Storer DH (1859). "A History of the Fishes of Massachusetts". Memoirs of the American Academy of Arts and Sciences 6 (2): 309–372.

Species Descriptions
Among the fish he described are:
The tessellated darter (Etheostoma olmstedi)
The yellowtail flounder (Limanda ferruginea)
The rainbow darter (Etheostoma caeruleum) 
The northern pipefish (Syngnathus fuscus)
The kelp pipefish (Syngnathus californiensis) 
The ashy darter (Etheostoma cinereum)
The northern studfish (Fundulus catenatus)
The wrymouth, (Cryptacanthodes maculatus), sometimes called a ghostfish
The blackspotted topminnow, (Fundulus olivaceus) 
He also described the snake: Storeria occipitomaculata, commonly known as the Redbelly Snake

:Category:Taxa named by David Humphreys Storer

References

External links

Physicians from Massachusetts
People from Portland, Maine
Harvard Medical School faculty
1804 births
1891 deaths
Physicians from Maine
American naturalists
Harvard Medical School alumni
Bowdoin College alumni
Presidents of the American Medical Association